Nadao is a short name for the company Nadao Bangkok.

Nadao may also refer to:

People 
 Hirokichi Nadao, Japanese politician
 Nadao Yoshinaga, American politician